Tulsi is a name.

List of people with the given name 
Acharya Tulsi (Jain monk) (1914–1997), Indian religious leader
Tulsi Agarwal (born 1959), Indian politician
Tulsi Bai Holkar (1788–1817), Indian queen
Tulsi Chakraborty (1899–1961), Indian actor and comedian
Tulsi Gabbard (born 1981), American politician
Tulsi Ghimire (born 1959)
Tulsi Giri (1926–2018), Nepali politician and the Prime Minister of Nepal from 1975 to 1977
Tulsi Gowda, Indian environmentalist
Tulsi Kumar (born 1986), Indian actress
Tulsi Lahiri (1897–1959), Bengali actor
Tulsi Ram (born 1944), Indian politician
Tulsi Ram Khelwan, Fijian political leader
Tulsi Ram Sharma, Fijian lawyer and trade unionist
Tulsi Ramsay (1944–2018), Indian film director
Tulsi Silawat (born 1954), Indian politician
Tulsi Singh Yadav (died 2015), Indian politician

List of people with the middle name 

 Sandeep Tulsi Yadav, Indian Greco-Roman wrestler

List of people with the surname 

 Rajkavi Inderjeet Singh Tulsi, Indian Poet & Bollywood Lyricist
K. T. S. Tulsi (born 1947), Indian politician
 Kashinath Shastri Appa Tulsi, Indian musician and scholar
 Tathagat Avatar Tulsi (born 1987), Indian physician

See also 

 Ocimum tenuiflorum
 Tuli (name)
 Thuli (given name)
 Tulli
 Tulsidas

Given names
Surnames
Feminine given names
Masculine given names
Indian feminine given names
Surnames of Indian origin